Revo Uninstaller is an uninstaller for Microsoft Windows. It uninstalls programs and additionally removes any files and Windows registry entries left behind by the program's uninstaller or by the Windows uninstall function.

Features 
Revo Uninstaller first runs the selected program's built-in uninstaller, then searches and removes associated files and registry entries that the uninstaller may not have removed from the user's drive.

Revo Uninstaller also cleans out:
 Files in the temporary folder
 Entries in the Windows start-up applications folder
 Browser history and cache of Internet Explorer, Firefox, Opera and Netscape
 The recently opened file list in Microsoft Office applications

Revo Uninstaller can also irrecoverably delete files.

A portable version is available that can be run without installing onto or modifying the system, in particular from external storage media such as USB and network drives.

The freeware version 2 of Revo Uninstaller can support both 32-bit and 64-bit applications.

See also 
 Uninstaller

References

External links 
 

Freemium
Portable software
Uninstallers for Windows
Windows-only software